"Think a Little Less" is a song recorded by American country music artist Michael Ray. It was released on April 25, 2016 as the third single from Ray's major-label debut album. This song was written by Barry Dean, Jon Nite, Jimmy Robbins, and Thomas Rhett.

Critical reception

The song debuted at No. 53 on Country Airplay for chart dated May 7, 2016, but only entered the Hot Country Songs chart on October 15, 2016. On March 20, 2017 the song hit number one on Country Music Radio giving Michael Ray his second career number one song.

The song has sold 278,000 copies in the United States as of April 2017.

Music video
A music video featuring mostly live footage, done in black-and-white, was directed by Cody Kern and premiered in June 2016. 

An alternate music video directed by Jack Guy was later shot and premiered on CMT in January 2017.

Chart performance

Year-end charts

Certifications

References

2015 songs
2016 singles
Country ballads
2010s ballads
Michael Ray (singer) songs
Atlantic Records singles
Warner Records Nashville singles
Songs written by Barry Dean (songwriter)
Songs written by Jon Nite
Songs written by Thomas Rhett
Songs written by Jimmy Robbins
Song recordings produced by Scott Hendricks